Sereda is a genus of moths belonging to the subfamily Olethreutinae of the family Tortricidae.

Species
Sereda myodes Diakonoff, 1953
Sereda tautana (Clemens, 1865)

See also
List of Tortricidae genera

References

External links

tortricidae.com

Grapholitini
Tortricidae genera